The 2015 Hart District Council election took place on 7 May 2015 to elect members of the Hart District Council in England. It was held on the same day as other local elections. Prior to this elections, the Conservatives held a plurality with 14 seats but did not hold a majority, whilst the Liberal Democrats and Community Campaign (Hart) both had 8 seats. The remaining seat was held by an independent.

Results 
These were the second elections to be held with the new boundaries after the 2014 elections, which saw the Conservatives elected the largest party but without a majority, while Community Campaign (Hart) and the Liberal Democrats won nine seats each alongside won independent candidate. As such, the council remained under no overall control. In the 2015 election, the Conservatives were the only party to make gains, winning two new seats, one each from the Liberal Democrats and Community Campaign Hart, with no other changes. The council remained under no overall control. As well as the three party groups on the council, one independent from Hook Ward remained but was not up for election until 2018.

The table below only tallies the votes of the highest polling candidate for each party within each ward. This is known as the top candidate method and is often used for multi-member plurality elections. Most wards only had one seat up for election, but several had two.

Ward Results

Blackwater & Hawley

Crookham East

Crookham West and Ewshot

Fleet Central

Fleet East

Fleet West

Hartley Witney

Hook

Odiham

Yateley East

Yateley West

Notes

References 

2015 English local elections
May 2015 events in the United Kingdom
2015
2010s in Hampshire